Alfonso IV d'Este (2 February 1634 – 16 July 1662) was Duke of Modena and Reggio from 1658 until his death. He was the father of Mary of Modena, consort of James II of England.

Alfonso was born in Modena, the eldest son of Francesco I d'Este, Duke of Modena, and his first wife, Maria Caterina Farnese. He became Duke of Modena and Reggio after his father's death in 1658. Alfonso's health was poor and he suffered from gout and tuberculosis. He died four years into his reign.

In 1655 he married Laura Martinozzi, Cardinal Mazarin's niece, thus strengthening his alliance with France. On Laura's sixteenth birthday, 27 May 1655, she was married to the Duke of Modena by proxy at the Palace of Compiègne, with the Count of Soissons standing in the place of the Duke of Modena. They had two children, Maria and Francesco, who went on to become Queen of England and Duke of Modena respectively.

In 1659 the Franco-Spanish War came to an end and Modena was rewarded with the town of Correggio for supporting France.

He was succeeded by his two-year-old son, under the regency of his widow.

Ancestry

References

External links

Hereditary Princes of Modena
1634 births
1662 deaths
Alfonso 4
Alfonso 4
Alfonso 4
17th-century Italian nobility
Alfonso 4